Zaniboni is an Italian surname. Notable people with the surname include:

Giuseppe Zaniboni (born 1949), Italian footballer
Sergio Zaniboni (1937–2017), Italian comic artist and writer
Tito Zaniboni, attempted assassin of Mussolini

Italian-language surnames